The 2019–20 season is Kitchee's 41st season in the top-tier division in Hong Kong football. Kitchee has competed in the Premier League, Senior Challenge Shield, FA Cup, Sapling Cup and AFC Cup this season.

Squad

First Team
As of 24 September 2020

 
 

 
 FP

 FP
 FP
 FP
 FP

 FP

 LP 
 

 FP

 LP 
 LP

 

 FP

Remarks:
LP These players are considered as local players in Hong Kong domestic football competitions.
FP These players are registered as foreign players.

Transfers

Transfers in

Transfers out

Loans Out

Club officials

Club Senior staff

Club Coach staff

Competitions

Hong Kong Premier League

Table

Results by round

Results summary

League Matches 
On 14 August 2019, the fixtures for the forthcoming season were announced.

Hong Kong Senior Challenge Shield

Hong Kong Sapling Cup

Group stage

Final

Hong Kong FA Cup

Remarks

References

Kitchee SC seasons
Hong Kong football clubs 2019–20 season